Wellington Daniel dos Santos Gonçalves (born July 7, 1983) is a Brazilian former football.

Career
Wellington moved to Greece in March 2003, initially joining Apollon Kalamarias on a two-year contract. In February 2005, he extended his stay with Apollon for another 3 years.

In August 2008, he joined Thrasyvoulos on a one-year contract. Successive six-month spells with Diagoras and Agrotikos Asteras followed.

In July 2010, Wellington moved to Agrotikos Asteras on a two-year contract.

References

External links

Guardian's Stats Centre

Living people
1983 births
Brazilian footballers
Apollon Pontou FC players
Thrasyvoulos F.C. players
Anagennisi Karditsa F.C. players
Doxa Drama F.C. players
Brazilian expatriate footballers
Expatriate footballers in Greece
Super League Greece players
Association football forwards
Panelefsiniakos F.C. players
Footballers from São Paulo (state)